Cody McCormick (born April 18, 1983) is a Canadian former ice hockey player and coach. He is of European and First Nations descent, with both Oneida and Chippewa/Ojibway ancestors.
Cody McCormick is from London, Ontario Canada and has played for Colorado Avalanche, Buffalo Sabres, and Minnesota Wild. He was also the head coach of the Buffalo Beauts of the National Women's Hockey League from December 2018 to May 2019.

Playing career

Ontario Hockey League 
McCormick was selected 37th overall by the Belleville Bulls junior hockey team, of the OHL. He played as a left winger for the Belleville, Ontario based team for all four years of his junior career, from 1990-2000 to 2002-2003.  During McCormick's four-year stint as a Bull, he accumulated a total of 56 goals, where 36 of them came from his 2002-2003 season.

National Hockey League 
McCormick was drafted 144th overall by the Colorado Avalanche in the 2001 NHL Entry Draft from the Belleville Bulls of the OHL. In his last junior year 2002–03, and as Captain, McCormick had a breakout year offensively with the Bulls, posting 36 goals and 69 points in 61 games. He was selected to the OHL First All-Star Team and named the Best Checker in the OHL.

McCormick turned professional in 2003–04 and made his NHL debut with the Avalanche and split the year between the Avs and AHL affiliate the Hershey Bears. McCormick spent the next four seasons between the Avalanche and the AHL before he found a full-time role with Colorado in 2008–09 playing in a NHL high 55 games and contributing 12 points.

On August 1, 2009, McCormick signed a one-year contract with the Buffalo Sabres. He was then assigned to AHL affiliate, the Portland Pirates for the 2009–10 season, posting professional career highs with 17 goals and 29 points in 66 games. During the playoffs with the Pirates McCormick was recalled to Buffalo as an injury replacement for additional toughness. On April 21, 2010, McCormick made his debut with the Sabres in Game 4 of the first round of the Eastern Conference playoffs against the Boston Bruins recording an assist on a goal by Tim Kennedy.

Contributing with 2 assists in his brief showing with Buffalo, he was then re-signed to a one-year, one-way contract with the Sabres on July 2, 2010.  During his time with the Sabres Cody McCormick garnered the most penalty minutes at 142 minutes total. playing primarily on the fourth line with Patrick Kaleta.

During the shortened 2012–13 season, his fourth with the Sabres organization, McCormick was placed on waivers on February 20, 2013. With appearing in only 8 scoreless games he passed through unclaimed the following day and was immediately reassigned to AHL affiliate, the Rochester Americans.

After returning from a lengthy injury with the Sabres during the 2013–14 season, McCormick was included in a trade by Buffalo along with Matt Moulson to the Minnesota Wild in exchange for Torrey Mitchell and draft picks on March 5, 2014.

At the conclusion of the season, McCormick ended his brief stint with the Wild to return to the Sabres as a free agent on a three-year contract on July 1, 2014. In January 2015, McCormick experienced blood clots that prevented him from playing the rest of the season and the entire 2015–16 campaign. Similar to Pascal Dupuis, despite efforts to medicate and become healthier the complications of the blood clots spreading to McCormick's lungs lead to him retiring at 32 years of age.

Personal life
McCormick is married with two daughters and resides in Buffalo, New York during the off-season. His wife is Alyssa Paiement, the daughter of former NHLer Wilf Paiement. McCormick is from Chippewa of the Thames First Nation, located in Southwestern Ontario, near London, Ontario. The Thames First Nations can also be referred to as Anishinaabeg, meaning the original people. They are from the territory of Deshkaan Ziibing. McCormick's ancestors originally arrived from north-eastern region of North America, where they then settled in the area of the Great Lakes.

Career statistics

Awards and honours

References

External links
 

1983 births
Albany River Rats players
Belleville Bulls players
Buffalo Sabres players
Canadian ice hockey centres
Colorado Avalanche draft picks
Colorado Avalanche players
First Nations sportspeople
Hershey Bears players
Premier Hockey Federation coaches
Ice hockey people from Ontario
Lake Erie Monsters players
Living people
Lowell Lock Monsters players
Minnesota Wild players
Portland Pirates players
Rochester Americans players
Sportspeople from London, Ontario
Canadian ice hockey coaches